Haizhou District is a district of Fuxin, Liaoning, People's Republic of China.

Administrative divisions
There are eight subdistricts and one town within the district.

Subdistricts:
Heping Subdistrict, Xinxing Subdistrict, Xishan Subdistrict, Hebei Subdistrict, Zhanqian Subdistrict, West Fuxin Subdistrict, Wulong Subdistrict, Gongrencun Subdistrict

The only town is Hanjiadian

References

County-level divisions of Liaoning